Kjellerup Idrætsforening is a Danish football club currently playing in the Denmark Series, the fifth tier of the Danish football league system. They play at Bjerget Stadium in Kjellerup, Central Jutland.

History
The club was formed in summer 1907 under the name "Fodboldforeningen Skjold", but in 1930 changed the association name to the current. In 1920, the club's program expanded to include swimming, athletics, handball and winter sport, but in 1946 it was decided to continue the association as a pure football club and other sports were transferred to the newly formed "Kjellerup Gymnastikforening" (Kjellerup Gymnastics Association).

In the summer of 2011, the club won the Denmark Series and moved up into Danish 2nd Division West for the first time in club history.

References

External links
 Official site

 
Football clubs in Denmark
Association football clubs established in 1907
1907 establishments in Denmark
IF